Podgrad is a settlement south of Novo Mesto in southeastern Slovenia. The area is part of the traditional region of Lower Carniola and is now included in the Southeast Slovenia Statistical Region.

The local parish church, built on a slight elevation on the edge of the village, is dedicated to the Our Lady of Good Counsel and belongs to the Roman Catholic Diocese of Novo Mesto. It was built in the early 17th century and extensively rebuilt in the 19th century.

References

External links
Podgrad on Geopedia

Populated places in the City Municipality of Novo Mesto